Mohamed Zineddaine (born 1 January 1957 in Oued Zem) is a Moroccan-Italian journalist, photographer, filmmaker, screenwriter and producer.

Biography

Education 
In 1983, he moved to France to study computer science in Nice. After a year, he moved to Bologna to study directing at the DAMS (Department of Art, Music and Performing Arts) at the University of Bologna.

Partial filmography

Feature films 
 2004 : Risveglio (Réveil)
 2008 : Ti ricordi di Adil? (Do You Remember Adil?)
 2012 : Colère (Anger)
 2018 : La Guérisseuse (The Healer)

Short films and documentaries 
 2002 : La vecchia ballerina

External links

References 

1957 births
Italian film directors
Living people
Moroccan emigrants to Italy
Moroccan film directors
People from Oued Zem